John Belton (1 May 1895 – 1952) was an English professional footballer who made over 320 appearances as a right half in the Football League for Nottingham Forest.

Personal life 
Belton served as a private in the Leicestershire Regiment and the Labour Corps during the First World War. He was wounded at the Battle of the Somme in 1916 and was evacuated to Britain.

Honours 
Nottingham Forest

 Football League Second Division: 1921–22

Career statistics

References 

1895 births
1952 deaths
English footballers
English Football League players
Association football wing halves
Association football forwards
Sportspeople from Loughborough
Footballers from Leicestershire
Loughborough Corinthians F.C. players
Nottingham Forest F.C. players
Royal Leicestershire Regiment soldiers
Royal Pioneer Corps soldiers
British Army personnel of World War I
Military personnel from Leicestershire